Soyrik is a Marathi-language romantic drama film written and directed by Makarand Mane. Produced by 99 Productions and Bahuroopi Productions.

Cast 
 Manasi Bhawalkar
 Nitish Chavan
 Shashank Shende
 Rajshree Nikam
 Chhaya Kadam 
 Priyadarshani Indalkar
 Kishor Kadam
 Neeta Shende 
 Sanjeevkumar Patil 
 Rajendra Kamble 
 Yogesh Nikam
 Aparna Kshemkalyani
 Aarav Pawar 
 Shanthanu Gangane
 Ovi Tadwalkar 
 Praful Kamble 
 Chaitanya Deore 
 Lara Salunke
 Vanmala Kinikar 
 Pratiksha Kote 
 Shamraj Bhagavant
 Ishan Godse 
 Aparna Gavhane

Soundtrack 
Music is given by Vijay Narayan Gavande and lyrics is by Vaibhav Deshmukh. The film Soyrik songs are recorded by Ajay Gogawale, Amita Ghugari and Shamika Bhide.

References

External links 
 

2022 films
2020s Marathi-language films